Longitarsus alfierii is a species of beetle in the Galerucinae subfamily that can be found in such European countries as Bulgaria, Greece, North Macedonia, Spain, Ukraine, Yugoslavia, and on Crete. It is also common in Near East and North Africa as well.

Subspecies
Longitarsus alfierii alfierii Pic, 1923
Longitarsus alfierii furthi Gruev, 1982

References

A
Beetles described in 1923
Beetles of Europe
Taxa named by Maurice Pic